Yingke Law Firm (Yingke) is an international commercial law firm headquartered in Beijing, China. It is the largest China-based law firm measured by number of lawyers.

History
Yingke Law Firm was founded on August 14, 2001. In the 12 months to June 2010, Yingke opened offices in Hohhot, Nanjing, Shanghai, Shenyang, Shijiazhuang and Tianjin, China.

In September 2010, Yingke opened an office in Budapest, its first in Europe, through the formation of a joint-venture with the Hungarian law firm Várnai & Partners.

In March 2011, Yingke opened an office in Verona, Italy through the creation of a joint-venture with the Italian law firm Advoco.

In January 2012, Yingke opened offices in Istanbul and Warsaw, with a plan to initially recruit 25 lawyers and consultants in the latter city.

In March 2012, Yingke opened offices in New York City and São Paulo, and received approval from the Law Society of Hong Kong to establish a branch office in Hong Kong.

In October 2012, Yingke opened an office in Mexico City.

In March 2013, Yingke announced that it would open offices in Brussels and Milan in April 2013, through associations with local firms Oswell & Vahida and Mercanti Dorio e Associati respectively.

In April 2013 Yingke merged with the Israeli boutique law firm Eyal Khayat Zolty, Neiger & Co, providing it with its first office in the country.

In September 2019, Yingke established its new New York office: YK Law LLP.

In March 2020, Yingke established its new consulting arm: YK Consulting.

In July 2020, Yingke established its Sydney office: Yingke Law Firm (Sydney).

Main practice areas
Yingke's main practice areas include:

capital markets
mergers and acquisitions
dispute resolution
commercial litigation
employment and industrial relations
entertainment
financial services regulation
insurance
intellectual property
real estate
restructuring and insolvency
taxations

See also 
List of largest Chinese law firms
Legal history of China
Chinese law

References

External links
Yingke 1st Global Board of Directors
(http://www.yingkeinternational.com)

Law firms of China
Law firms established in 2001
2001 establishments in China